Thijs ter Horst (born 18 September 1991) is a Dutch professional volleyball player. He is part of the Dutch national team. At the professional club level, he plays for Suwon KEPCO Vixtorm.

Thijs ter Horst was born and raised in the eastern part of the Netherlands, where he started playing volleyball in 1998 in Flash Nijverdal.

Honours

Clubs
 National championships
 2010/2011  Dutch SuperCup, with Orion Doetinchem
 2018/2019  KOVO Cup, with Samsung Bluefangs
 2020/2021  Italian SuperCup, with Sir Safety Conad Perugia
 2021/2022  Italian Cup, with Sir Safety Conad Perugia

External links

 
 Player profile at LegaVolley.it  
 Player profile at Volleybox.net 

1991 births
Living people
Sportspeople from Almelo
Dutch men's volleyball players
Dutch expatriate sportspeople in Italy
Expatriate volleyball players in Italy
Dutch expatriate sportspeople in South Korea
Expatriate volleyball players in South Korea
Blu Volley Verona players
Outside hitters